NGC 4580 is an unbarred spiral galaxy located about 70 million light-years away in the constellation Virgo. NGC 4580 is also classified as a LINER galaxy. It was discovered by astronomer William Herschel on February 2, 1786 and is a member of the Virgo Cluster.

Physical characteristics
NGC 4580 consists of a ringed structure. The inner pseudoring of the galaxy is very well-defined and is made of two tightly wound spiral arms. Three very diffuse spiral arms which are partly defined by dust, split off from the inner pseudoring.

Truncated disk
NGC 4580 has a severely truncated star-forming disk. This may be due to ram-pressure stripping caused by the infall of the Messier 49 subcluster into the Virgo Cluster. Due to the truncation of the star forming disk, NGC 4580 is classified as an anemic galaxy.

See also
 List of NGC objects (4001–5000)
 NGC 4689
 Messier 90

References

External links

Virgo (constellation)
LINER galaxies
Unbarred spiral galaxies
4580
42174
7794
Astronomical objects discovered in 1786
Virgo Cluster
Discoveries by William Herschel
Peculiar galaxies